Bulyakay (Büläkäy) is a rural locality (a village) in Podlubovsky Selsoviet, Karmaskalinsky District, Bashkortostan, Russia. The population was 129 as of 2010. There are 2 streets.

Geography 
Bulyakay is located 39 km west of Karmaskaly (the district's administrative centre) by road. Sulu-Kuak is the nearest rural locality.

References 

Rural localities in Karmaskalinsky District